17 Avenue SW is a major east–west arterial road in the southwest quadrant of the city of Calgary, Alberta.

Between the Calgary Stampede Grounds and 14 Street SW, it is a commercial street—with bars, restaurants, nightclubs, and shops—which has been designated a Business Revitalization Zone, officially named 17th Ave Retail and Entertainment District.

From 14th Street to Sarcee Trail, it is flanked by a mix of residential and commercial space, with small strip malls, a retirement home, and denser commercial developments in the Westbrook Mall area. West of Sarcee Trail, it runs through suburban neighbourhoods and acreages, by Rundle College and Westside Recreation Centre.

The west extension of the C-Train light rail transit system runs along 17 Avenue west of 33 Street SW, as does the rapid bus transit.

Red Mile

17th Avenue was nicknamed the "Red Mile" in 2004 during the playoff run of Calgary's NHL team, the Calgary Flames. During this time, it was not uncommon to see over 100,000 fans crowding the street and its bars and pubs on game nights.. The block has become the unofficial gathering place for Calgary Flames fans, with many celebrating in the street during their last playoff run in 2015.   The street also "dead-ends" at the Stampede Grounds on its east side and is thus central to the party-like atmosphere that overtakes the city during the Calgary Stampede festival.

Major intersections 
From east to west.

See also

Transportation in Calgary

References

External links 
17th Ave Business Directory

17th Ave Retail & Entertainment District

Roads in Calgary
Tourist attractions in Calgary
Shopping districts and streets in Canada
17th Ave Retail and Entertainment District